Navid Mohamed Dorzadeh (born 10 February 2000), is a Qatari professional footballer who plays as a forward for Qatar Stars League side Al-Ahli.

Career
Dorzadeh started his career at Al-Ahli. is constantly playing with the Al-Ahli U23, On 26 July 2020,  Dorzadeh made his professional debut for Al-Ahli against Al-Shahania in the Pro League, replacing John Benson .

Career statistics

Club

Notes

References

External links

2000 births
Living people
Qatari footballers
Association football forwards
Al Ahli SC (Doha) players
Qatar Stars League players